Mos Dub is a mashup album of Mos Def and various classic reggae samples that was mixed and produced by New York producer Max Tannone. The album was officially released to download on April 6, 2010.

Style
Editing tracks from popular dub music, like King Tubby, Lee Perry, Scientist, The Slickers, Johnny Osbourne, Big Youth and Dawn Penn, and laying the a cappella tracks from Mos Def, Tannone has created a unique atmosphere where both Brooklyn Hip hop and Jamaican reggae have been mixed seamlessly. The tracks have been described, in a positive way, as not sounding like part of a mashup, and Mos Def's raps as fitting over the music naturally.

Mos Dub was released as a free download on April 6, 2010, off of the official Mos Dub website.  There is also an unofficial vinyl release of the album.

Tannone released a followup to Mos Dub, called Dub Kweli.

Reception

Critics have generally viewed the album positively. David James Young of Sputnikmusic stated that "...Mos Dub has the perfect sound, runtime, and lyrical content to make for a great summer car-ride CD". New York described the album as "perfect summer BBQ music." MTV Music tweeted about the album. Hip-hop site Okayplayer described the album as "dope." Adam Horovitz, also known as Ad-Rock of the Beastie Boys gave his approval of the album on the day of its release in his personal blog. Also, it has been said that the album is pleasing to fans of reggae music as well.

Not all reviews have been positive; Vice stated that Mos Dub was an album that "the world doesn’t really need".

Track list

References

External links
 Official website of Mos Dub

2010 remix albums
Mos Def albums
Reggae remix albums
Self-released albums
Mashup albums